Kailash is a mountain in Tibet, considered to be sacred in four religions.

Kailash may also refer to:

Places and buildings
Kailash, Nepal
Kailash Colony, in South Delhi, India
Kailash Colony metro station, Delhi, India
Greater Kailash
Greater Kailash (Delhi Assembly constituency)

People
Kailash (actor) (fl. from 2008), Indian actor
Bacchu Kailash (born 1995), Nepalese singer and musician
Kailash Bhansali (born 1942), Indian politician
Kailash Baitha (born 1948), Indian politician
Kailash Chawla (born 1948), Indian politician
Kailash Chandra Gahtori (born 1968), Indian businessman and politician
Kailash Chandra Joshi (1929–2019), Indian politician
Kailash Nath Kasudhan (fl. from 1999), Nepalese politician
Kailash Nath Katju (1887–1968), Indian politician
Kailash Kher (born 1973), Indian pop singer
Kailash Chandra Meghwal (born 1934), Indian politician
Kailash Chandra Meher (born 1954), Indian artist, inventor and social activist
Kailash Patil, (born 1987), Indian footballer
Kailash Purryag (born 1947), President of Mauritius
Kailash Mehra Sadhu (born 1956), (female) Kashmiri singer
Kailash Sankhala (1925–1994), Indian naturalist and conservationist
Kailash Satyarthi (born 1954), Indian children's rights activist and Nobel Peace Prize Laureate
Kailash Nath Sonkar, Indian politician
Kailash Surendranath (fl. from 1986), Indian filmmaker
Kailash Vijayvargiya (born 1956), Indian politician
Kailash Nath Singh Yadav (born 1957), Indian politician

Other uses
 Kailash (journal), scholarly journal about the Himalayan region

See also

 Kinnaur Kailash, a mountain in the Kinnaur district, Himachal Pradesh, India
 Manimahesh Kailash Peak, or Chamba Kailash, in Chamba district, Himachal Pradesh, India

Hindu given names